Jennifer Greene is one of the pseudonyms for Jill Alison Hart (born in Michigan, United States). She is a writer of over 85 romance novels since 1980. She has also written novels as Jeanne Grant and Jessica Massey, and uses the name Alison Hart as a business name for her writing.

She has been honored with many awards. In the summer of 1998 she was inducted into the Romance Writers of America's Hall of Fame, and later received the Nora Roberts Lifetime Achievement Award.

Biography
Greene obtained a degree in English and in Psychology from the Michigan State University. At Michigan State she was honored with the Lantern Night Award (which MSU traditionally gives to 50 outstanding women graduates) . She sold her first book in 1980 under the pen name Jessica Massey, and from 1983 to 1987 published under the pseudonym Jeanne Grant. Since 1986 she has used the pseudonym Jennifer Greene. In addition to writing Greene has worked as a teacher, counselor, and personal manager. She is married and lives in the country near Benton Harbor, Michigan.

Bibliography

As Jennifer Greene

Category romances
 Yours, Mine and Ours (Silhouette Special Edition, 2011)
 Billionaire's Handler (Silhouette Special Edition, 2010)
 Hot to the Touch (Silhouette Desire, 2005)
 Millionaire M.D. (Silhouette Desire, 2001)
 Rock Solid (Silhouette Desire, 2000)
 Her Holiday Secret (Silhouette Desire, 1998)
 A Baby in his In-Box (Silhouette Desire, 1998)
 Nobody’s Princess (Silhouette Desire, 1997) - RWA Rita Winner
 Single Dad (Silhouette Desire, 1995) - RWA Rita Winner
 Arizona Heat (Silhouette Desire, 1995)
 A Groom for Red Riding Hood (Silhouette Desire, 1994)
 Quicksand (Silhouette Desire, 1993) - RWA Rita Finalist
 Just Like Old Times (Silhouette Desire, 1992)
 Night Light (Silhouette Desire, 1991)
 Falconer (Silhouette Desire, 1991)
 Slow Dance (Silhouette Desire, 1990)
 Heat Wave (Silhouette Desire, 1990)
 Broken Blossom (Silhouette Intimate Moments, 1990)
 Night of the Hunter (Silhouette Desire, 1989) - RWA Rita Winner
 Devil’s Night (Silhouette Intimate Moments, 1989) - RWA Rita Finalist
 Dancing in the Dark (Silhouette Desire, 1989)
 Secrets (Silhouette Intimate Moments, 1988) - RWA Rita Finalist
 The Castle Keep (Silhouette Desire, 1988)
 Love Potion (Silhouette Desire, 1988)
 Lady of the Island (Silhouette Desire, 1988)
 Minx (Silhouette Desire, 1987)
 Dear Reader (Silhouette Desire, 1987)
 Lady Be Good (Silhouette Desire, 1987)
 Madam’s Room (Silhouette Desire, 1987)
 Foolish Pleasure (Silhouette Desire, 1986)
 Body and Soul (Silhouette Desire, 1986)

Single titles
 Blame it on Paris (HQN, 2008)
 Blame it on Cupid (HQN, 2007) - RWA Rita Winner
 Blame it on Chocolate (HQN, 2006)
 Sparkle (Harlequin, 2006)
 Lucky (Harlequin, 2005)
 Where is he Now? (Avon, 2003)
 The Woman Most Likely To… (Avon, 2002)

Series books

New Man in Town Series
 Mesmerizing Stranger (Silhouette Romantic Suspense, 2010)
 Irresistible Stranger (Silhouette Romantic Suspense, 2010)
 Secretive Stranger (Silhouette Romantic Suspense, 2010)

Lavender Series
 Wild in the Moment (Silhouette Desire, 2004)
 Wild in the Moonlight (Silhouette Desire, 2004)
 Wild in the Field (Silhouette Desire, 2003)

Royal Charming Happily Ever After Series
 Kiss Your Prince Charming (Silhouette Desire, 2000)
 Prince Charming’s Child (Silhouette Desire, 1999)

Stanford Sisters Series
 Bachelor Mom (Silhouette Desire, 1997)
 The 200% Wife (Silhouette Special Edition, 1997)
 The Unwilling Bride (Silhouette Desire, 1996)

Jock’s Boys Series
 Bewitched (Silhouette Desire, 1994)
 Bothered (Silhouette Desire, 1994)
 Bewildered (Silhouette Desire, 1994)

Shepard Brothers Series
 It Had To Be You (Silhouette Desire, 1992)
 Pink Topaz (Silhouette Intimate Moments, 1992)

Special Series
 The Soon-To-Be-Disinherited Wife (Silhouette Desire “Secret Lives of Society Wives” series, 2006)
 Isabelle / Diana / Suzanna (2004) (with Christine Rimmer and Cheryl St. John)
 Montana Weddings (2001) (with Christine Rimmer and Cheryl St. John)
 You Belong To Me (Silhouette Desire “Montana Mavericks: Big Sky Brides Series, 2000) (with Christine Rimmer and Cheryl St. John)
 The Honor-Bound Groom (Silhouette “Fortune’s Children Series”, 1998)
 The Baby Chase (Silhouette “Fortune’s Children Series”, 1997)

Novellas
 Blame it on the Blizzard (Silhouette “Baby It’s Cold Outside” anthology, 2010)
 Kokomo (Harlequin “Summer Dreams” anthology, 2007)
 Born in my Heart (Harlequin “Like Mother, Like Daughter” anthology, 2007) - RWA Rita Winner
 Twelfth Night (Silhouette “Santa’s Little Helpers’ anthology, 1995)
 The Christmas House (Silhouette “Gifts of Fortune” anthology, 2001)
 Riley’s Baby (Silhouette “Birds, Bees and Babies” anthology, 1990)

As Jeanne Grant

Category romances
 Tender Loving Care (1987)
 No More Mr. Nice Guy (1986)
 Sweets to the Sweet (1986)
 Pink Satin (1985)
 Can’t Say No (1985)
 Ain’t Misbehaving (1985) - RWA Rita Finalist
 Silver and Spice (1984) - RWA Rita Finalist
 Conquer the Memories (1984)
 Cupid’s Confederates (1984)
 Trouble in Paradise (1984)
 Wintergreen (1984)
 Sunburst (1984)
 Kisses from Heaven (1984)
 A Daring Proposition (1983)
 Man from Tennessee (1983)

As Jessica Massey

Single books
 Stormy Surrender (1984)

Awards
 1984 RWA Silver Medallion Winner, Silver and Spice
 1985 Romantic Times, Best Sensual Series Author Winner
 1986 RWA, Golden Medallion Finalist, Ain't Misbehaven
 1987 Affaire de Coeur, Silver Certificate Winner, No More Mr. Nice Guy
 1988–1989 Romantic Times Lifetime Achievement Award Winner
 1989 RWA Golden Medallion Finalist, Secrets
 1989 RWA RITA Winner, Night of the Hunter
 1989 Romantic Times, Best Series Romance Author Winner
 1989 Affaire de Coeur, Silver Certificate Winner, Night of the Hunter
 1990 RWA Golden Medallion Finalist, Devil's Night
 1991 RWA RITA Finalist, Broken Blossom, 1991
 1991–1992 Romantic Times, Reviewers Choice in Series Romantic Suspense Winner - PINK TOPAZ
 1991–1992 Romantic Times Career Achievement Award Winner - Series Romantic Adventure
 1994 RWA RITA Finalist, Quicksand
 1996 RWA RITA Winner, Single Dad
 1998 RWA RITA Winner, Nobody's Princess
 1998 RWA Hall of Fame
 1998 Romantic Times, Career Achievement Award Winner - Storyteller of the Year
 2008 RWA RITA Winner, Born in My Heart
 2009 Nora Roberts Lifetime Achievement Award

References

External links
 Jennifer Greene's Official Website
 Jennifer Greene at eHarlequin
 Jennifer Greene at Mills & Boon
 Jennifer Greene's Official Website
 Jeanne Grant and Jennifer Greene at Fantastic Fiction

20th-century American novelists
21st-century American novelists
American women novelists
American romantic fiction writers
Michigan State University alumni
RITA Award winners
Year of birth missing (living people)
Living people
Women romantic fiction writers
20th-century American women writers
21st-century American women writers